Frédéric Tatarian (born 30 December 1970 in Marseille, France) is a retired French footballer.

Honours

Club
OGC Nice
 Coupe de France: 1997

References

Profile

1970 births
Living people
French footballers
French people of Armenian descent
Olympique de Marseille players
FC Mulhouse players
OGC Nice players
SC Toulon players
US Créteil-Lusitanos players
FC Martigues players
FC Sion players
AS Cannes players
Ligue 1 players
Ligue 2 players
Footballers from Marseille
Association football midfielders